Sheila Janet Kathleen Boyde (formerly Catford, born 29 August 1960) was a British long-distance runner, who competed at the 1990 Commonwealth Games.

Boyde joined Leeds Athletic Club and trained with  Angie Pain and Veronique Marot. In September 1987 she announced herself by finishing as first female in the Glasgow Marathon in a time of 2:37:31. A year later, again in Glasgow, she won the Great Scottish Run half marathon in 72:49  and in 1989 an 11th place in the London Marathon sealed her place in the Scottish team for 1990 Commonwealth Games.

In 1990 Boyde represented Scotland, with compatriot Lynn Harding, in the Commonwealth Games and finished in 9th place. A year later she won the Florence Marathon and represented Britain in the 1991 World Marathon Cup which was run as part of the London Marathon.

Since Retiring Boyde has coached Harrogate athletes.

Competition Record

References

External links 
 
 
 

1960 births
Living people
British female long-distance runners
Scottish female long-distance runners
British female marathon runners
Scottish female marathon runners
Athletes (track and field) at the 1990 Commonwealth Games
Commonwealth Games competitors for Scotland